Sally, Irene and Mary is a 1938 American comedy film directed by William A. Seiter and written by Harry Tugend and Jack Yellen. It is based on the 1922 play Sally, Irene and Mary by Eddie Dowling and Cyrus Wood. The film stars Alice Faye, Tony Martin, Fred Allen, Jimmy Durante, Joan Davis, Marjorie Weaver and Gregory Ratoff. The film was released on March 4, 1938, by 20th Century Fox.

Plot
Manicurists Sally, Irene and Mary hope to be Broadway entertainers. When Mary inherits an old ferry boat, they turn it into a successful supper club.

Cast   
Alice Faye as Sally Day
Tony Martin as Tommy Reynolds
Fred Allen as Gabriel 'Gabby' Green
Joan Davis as Irene Keene
Marjorie Weaver as Mary Stevens
Gregory Ratoff as Baron Alex Zorka
Jimmy Durante as Jefferson Twitchel
Gypsy Rose Lee as Joyce Taylor 
Barnett Parker as Oscar
Eddie Collins as Ship's Captain
Mary Treen as Miss Barkow
Charles C. Wilson as Covered Wagon Cafe Manager 
J. Edward Bromberg as Pawnbroker
Raymond Scott as Orchestra Leader 
Andrew Tombes as Judge
Gwen Brian as Member of Vocal Specialty Trio 
Betty Brian as Member of Vocal Specialty Trio
Doris Brian as Member of Vocal Specialty Trio

References

External links
 

1938 films
1930s English-language films
20th Century Fox films
American comedy films
1938 comedy films
Films directed by William A. Seiter
American black-and-white films
1930s American films